Urlapovo is a rural locality (a selo) and the administrative center of Urlapovsky Selsoviet of Shipunovsky District, Altai Krai, Russia. The population was 840 in 2016. There are  5 streets.

Geography 
Urlapovo is located 48 km north of Shipunovo (the district's administrative centre) by road. Travnoye is the nearest rural locality.

References 

Rural localities in Shipunovsky District